On 18 May 2016, a Silk Way Airlines Antonov An-12 cargo plane crashed after an engine failure shortly after taking off from Dwyer Airport in southern Afghanistan, en route to Mary International Airport in Turkmenistan. Seven of the nine crew members on board were killed in the crash, which was the second incident for Silk Way in Afghanistan after a 2011 Il-76 crash. Two others were taken to hospital and treated for their injuries.

Arif Mammadov, head of Azerbaijan's State Civil Aviation Administration, said that the aircraft crashed after hitting an obstruction.

References 

Aviation accidents and incidents in 2016
Aviation accidents and incidents in Afghanistan
Accidents and incidents involving the Antonov An-12
2016 in Afghanistan
May 2016 events in Afghanistan
2016 disasters in Afghanistan